Bilinga is a small village in the Republic of the Congo.

Transport 
It is served by a station on the Congo-Ocean Railway near the place where a new railway route deviated from the original route.

Accidents 
On 22 June 2010, a serious train derailment down a ravine saw 72 or more casualties.

See also 
 Railway stations in Republic of the Congo

References 

Populated places in the Republic of the Congo